Keith Mullings (8 January 1968 – 29 May 2021) was a Jamaican professional boxer who competed from 1993 to 2001.

Professional career
Mullings turned pro in 1993 and challenged Raúl Márquez for the IBF light middleweight title in 1997, but lost a split decision. Most of Mullings losses were close or controversial, until late in his career. 
In Dec of 1997, Mullings shocked the world with a ninth round TKO over WBC and lineal light middleweight champion Terry Norris. After one defense, he lost the belt to Javier Castillejo in 1999 via majority decision in the opponent's hometown of Madrid. Later that year he took on former Olympian David Reid for the WBA light middleweight title, but lost a decision. In 2000 he lost a decision to Winky Wright, and retired in 2001, after his only knockout loss.  
Mullings had been working as a trainer in Peekskill, NY, prior to his death, at age 53.  No cause was given, with the announcement.

Professional boxing record

See also 
List of light middleweight boxing champions
List of WBC world champions

References

https://www.ringtv.com/622308-keith-mullings-former-junior-middleweight-champion-dies-at-age-53/

External links 
 
Keith Mullings - CBZ Profile

1968 births
2021 deaths
Light-middleweight boxers
World boxing champions
People from Manchester Parish
Jamaican male boxers
20th-century Jamaican people
21st-century Jamaican people